The Babadook is a 2014 Australian psychological horror film written and directed by Jennifer Kent in her directorial debut, and produced by Kristina Ceyton and Kristian Moliere. The film stars Essie Davis, Noah Wiseman, Daniel Henshall, Hayley McElhinney, Barbara West, and Ben Winspear. It is based on Kent's 2005 short film Monster, which follows a single mother who must confront her son's fear of a monster in their home.

Kent began developing the screenplay in 2009, intending to explore parenting and fear of madness in the film's story. Financing was secured through Australian government grants and partly through crowdfunding. Filming took place in Adelaide, where Kent drew from experiences as a production assistant on Lars von Trier's Dogville. During filming, the crew worked to ensure six-year-old Wiseman was protected from the challenging subject matter of the film. The titular monster and special effects were created with stop motion and handmade practical effects, and the score was composed by Jed Kurzel.

The film premiered at the 2014 Sundance Film Festival on 17 January, and was given a limited release in Australian art house cinemas beginning on 22 May 2014, initially failing to become a commercial success in its native country. However, The Babadook generated wider attention internationally, grossing $10 million worldwide against a $2 million budget. The film received critical acclaim and was the best-reviewed horror film of 2014, with critics commending its scares, creature design, story and exploration of grief. It won three of its six nominations at the AACTA Awards, including Best Film. A modern cult film, it maintained  following in subsequent years, partly due to becoming an internet meme.

Plot

Amelia Vanek is a troubled and exhausted widow living in Adelaide, who has brought up her six-year-old son Samuel alone. Her late husband, Oskar, was killed in a car accident that occurred as he drove Amelia to the hospital during labour. Sam begins displaying erratic behaviour: he becomes an insomniac and is preoccupied with an imaginary monster, which he has built weapons to fight. Amelia is forced to pick up her son from school after Sam brings one of the weapons there. One night, Sam asks his mother to read a pop-up storybook called Mister Babadook. It describes the titular monster, the Babadook, a tall pale-faced humanoid in a top hat with taloned fingers which torments its victims after they become aware of its existence. Amelia is disturbed by the book and its mysterious appearance, while Sam becomes convinced that the Babadook is real. Sam's persistence about the Babadook leads Amelia to often have sleepless nights as she tries to comfort him.

Soon after, strange events occur: doors open and close mysteriously by themselves, strange sounds are heard and Amelia finds glass shards in her food. She attributes the events to Sam's behaviour, but he blames the Babadook. Amelia rips up the book and disposes of it. At her birthday party, Sam's cousin Ruby bullies Sam for not having a father, in response to which he pushes her out of her tree house; as a result she breaks her nose. Amelia's sister Claire admits she cannot bear Sam, to which Amelia takes great offence. On the drive home, Sam has another vision of the Babadook and suffers a seizure, so Amelia gets some sedatives from a paediatrician.

The following morning, Amelia finds the Mister Babadook book reassembled on the front door step. New words taunt her by saying that the Babadook will become stronger if she continues to deny its existence, containing pop-ups of her killing their dog Bugsy, Sam, and then herself. Terrified, Amelia burns the book and runs to the police station after a disturbing phone call. However, Amelia has no proof of the stalking, and when she then sees the Babadook's suit hung up behind the front desk, she leaves. That night, Amelia tries to fall asleep and watches the Babadook open her bedroom door, crawl up the ceiling and attack her. She then turns on all the lights in the house and falls asleep with Sam downstairs. After the attack, Amelia starts to become more isolated and shut-in, becoming impatient, shouting at Samuel for 'disobeying' her constantly, and having frequent visions of the Babadook once again. Her mental state slowly decays and she exhibits erratic and violent behaviour, including cutting the phone line with a knife and then waving the same knife aggressively at Sam without realizing it. This devolves into disturbing hallucinations, in which Amelia violently murders Sam.

Shortly after these visions, Amelia sees an apparition of Oskar, who offers to return to her if she "brings the boy" to him. Realizing that he is a creation of the Babadook, Amelia flees and is stalked through the house by the Babadook until it finally possesses her. Under its influence she breaks Bugsy's neck and attempts to kill Sam. Eventually luring her into the basement, Sam knocks her out. Tied up, Amelia awakens with Sam, terrified, nearby. When she tries to strangle him, he lovingly caresses her face, causing her to regurgitate an inky black substance, which seemingly expels the Babadook. When Sam reminds Amelia that "you can't get rid of the Babadook," an unseen force drags him into Amelia's bedroom. After saving Sam, Amelia is forced by the Babadook to re-watch a vision of her husband's death. Furious, she confronts the Babadook, making the beast retreat into the basement, and she locks the door behind it.

After this ordeal, Amelia and Sam manage to recover. Amelia is attentive and caring toward him, encouraging him with building his weapons and being impressed at Sam's magic tricks. They gather earthworms in a bowl, and Amelia takes them to the basement, where the Babadook resides. She places the bowl on the floor for the Babadook to eat. The beast tries to attack her, but Amelia calms it down and it retreats to the corner, taking the earthworms with it. Amelia returns to the yard to celebrate Sam's birthday.

Cast

Production

Development

Kent studied at the National Institute of Dramatic Art (NIDA), where she learned acting alongside Davis, and graduated in 1991. She then worked primarily as an actor in the film industry for over two decades. Kent eventually lost her passion for acting by the end of the 1990s and sent a written proposal to Danish filmmaker Lars von Trier, asking if she could assist on the film set of von Trier's 2003 drama film, Dogville, to learn from the director. Kent's proposal was accepted and she considers the experience her film school, citing the importance of stubbornness as the key lesson she learned.

Prior to Babadook, Kent's first feature film, she had completed a short film, titled Monster, and an episode of the television series Two Twisted. Kent explained in May 2014 that the origins of Babadook can be found in Monster, which she calls "baby Babadook".

The writing of the screenplay began in around 2009 and Kent has stated that she sought to tell a story about facing up to the darkness within ourselves, the "fear of going mad" and an exploration of parenting from a "real perspective". In regard to parenting, Kent further explained in October 2014: "Now, I'm not saying we all want to go and kill our kids, but a lot of women struggle. And it is a very taboo subject, to say that motherhood is anything but a perfect experience for women." In terms of the characters, Kent said: "It was really important for me that they were loving, and loveable people. I don’t mean likeable – I mean that we really felt for them". In total, Kent completed five drafts of the script.

Kent drew from her experience on the set of Dogville for the assembling of her production team, as she observed that von Trier was surrounded by a well-known "family of people". Therefore, Kent sought her own "family of collaborators to work with for the long term." Unable to find all of the suitable people within the Australian film industry, Kent hired Polish director of photography (DOP) Radek Ladczuk, for whom Babadook was his first-ever English language film, and American illustrator Alexander Juhasz. In terms of film influences, Kent cited 1960s, '70s and '80s horror—including The Thing (1982), Halloween (1978), Les Yeux Sans Visage (1960), The Texas Chainsaw Massacre (1974), Carnival of Souls (1962) and The Shining (1980)—as well as Vampyr (1932), Nosferatu (1922) and Let The Right One In (2008).

Although the process was challenging and she was forced to reduce their total budget, producer Kristina Ceyton managed to secure funding of around A$2.5 million from government bodies Screen Australia and the SAFC; however, they still required an additional budget for the construction of the film sets. To attain the funds for the sets, Kent and Causeway Films producer Kristina Ceyton launched a Kickstarter crowdfunding campaign in June 2012, with a target of US$30,000. Their funding goal was reached on 27 September 2012 through pledges from 259 backers raising $30,071. Kent said that the crowdfunding closed a crucial gap in which to cover design and special effects expenses to build a "special visual world". 

Casting the child lead for the film involved casting director Nikki Barrett viewing around 500 audition tapes of young boys, before selecting smaller groups and individuals for in-person improvisation. Six-year old Noah Wiseman was selected as a standout, with Kent saying he had a certain innocence about him that older boys did not have, possibly as he is the son of a child psychologist.

Filming
The film was primarily shot in Adelaide, South Australia, with most of the interior shots filmed on a sound stage in the city; as funding was from the South Australian state government, this was a requirement that Kent needed to meet. However, Kent explained to the Den of Geek website that she is not patriotic and didn't want the film to be "particularly Australian".

To contribute to the universality of the film's appearance, a Victorian terrace-style house was specifically built for the film, as there are very few houses designed in such a style in Adelaide. A script reading was not done since Noah Wiseman was only six years old at the time, and Kent focused instead on bonding, playing games and lots of time spent with the actors so they could become more familiar with one another. Pre-production occurred in Adelaide and lasted three weeks and, during this time, Kent conveyed a "kiddie" version of the narrative to Wiseman, in which young Samuel is the hero. Kent took Wiseman to Adelaide Zoo to explain the story, and said Wiseman was aware it was a scary film and that he "knew how important his role was".

Kent originally wanted to film solely in black-and-white, as she wanted to create a "heightened feel" that is still believable. She was also influenced by pre-1950s B-grade horror films, as they were "very theatrical", in addition to being "visually beautiful and terrifying". Kent later lost interest in the black-and-white idea and worked closely with production designer Alex Holmes and Radek to create a "very cool", "very claustrophobic" interior environment with "meticulously designed" sets. The film's final colour scheme was achieved without the use of gels on the camera lenses or any alterations during the post-filming stage. Kent cited filmmakers David Lynch and Roman Polanski as key influences during the filming stage.

Kent described the filming process as "stressful" because of Wiseman's age. Kent explained "So I really had to be focused. We needed double the time we had." Wiseman's mother was on set and a "very protective, loving environment" was created. Kent explained after the release of the film that Wiseman was protected throughout the entire project: "During the reverse shots where Amelia was abusing Sam verbally, we had Essie [Davis] yell at an adult stand-in on his knees. I didn't want to destroy a childhood to make this film—that wouldn't be fair." Kent's friendship with Davis was a boon during filming and Kent praised her former classmate in the media: "To her credit, she's [Davis] very receptive, likes to be directed and is a joy to work with."

In terms of the Babadook monster and the scary effects of the film, Kent was adamant from the outset of production that a low-fi and handmade approach would be used. She cites the influence of Georges Méliès, Jean Epstein's The Fall of the House of Usher and Häxan. Kent used stop-motion effects for the monster and a large amount of smoothing was completed in post-production. Kent explained to the Empire publication: "There's been some criticism of the lo-fi approach of the effects, and that makes me laugh because it was always intentional. I wanted the film to be all in camera." She has also said that The Man in the Beaver Hat from the 1927 lost film London After Midnight was an inspiration for the design of the Babadook.

Music

The soundtrack was composed by Jed Kurzel. The score was officially released for the first time by Waxwork Records in 2017 on "black with red haze” vinyl. The record sleeve features a recreation of the pop-up book from the film.

Release
The film's global premiere was in January 2014 at the Sundance Film Festival. The film then received a limited theatrical release in Australia in May 2014, following a screening in April 2014 at the Stanley Film Festival.

In Singapore, the film was released on 25 September 2014. The film opened in the United Kingdom for general release on 17 October 2014, and in the United States on 28 November 2014. In 2020, amid cinema closures due to the COVID-19 pandemic, The Babadook was one of the films made available for free for screenings by independent cinemas by IFC Films.

Home media
The film, alongside the short film Monster, was first released on DVD and Blu-ray in Australia by Umbrella Entertainment on 31 October 2014. The U.S. Blu-ray and DVD was released on 14 April 2015 by IFC Midnight and Scream Factory, and the special edition was also available on that date. The special edition features Kent's short film, Monster, and behind the scenes feature Creating the Book by Juhasz. The UK Blu-ray Disc features the short documentary films Illustrating Evil: Creating the Book, There's No Place Like Home: Creating the House and Special Effects: The Stabbing Scene.

The film began streaming on Netflix in 2016 and was later obtained by Shudder.

Reception

Box office
The Babadook opened in Australia on 22 May 2014 in just 13 cinemas on a limited release, eventually grossing a total of only $258,000. The film fared much better internationally than it did in its native country. In North America, The Babadook opened on a limited release basis in three theaters and grossed US$30,007, with an average of $10,002 per theater. The film ranked in the 42nd position at the box office, and, as of 1 February 2015, has grossed $964,413 in the U.S. and $9.9 million elsewhere in the world. To date, the film's worldwide box office takings are $10.3 million which compares favourably with the estimated production budget of $2 million. It generated $633,000 in the United Kingdom in its opening weekend (surpassing its entire Australian run), and made over $1.09m in France and $335,000 in Thailand. In France, it opened at number 11 in the local box office, which producer Kristian Moliere credited to Wild Bunch's promoting, and contrasted this with Australian promoters that declined to book the film slots in multiplexes. Its success overseas re-generated interest in Australia ahead of DVD releases and television screenings.

Critical response
On Rotten Tomatoes the film holds an approval rating of 98% based on 243 reviews, with an average rating of 8.2/10. The site's critical consensus states: "The Babadook relies on real horror rather than cheap jump scares—and boasts a heartfelt, genuinely moving story to boot." It was ranked the best reviewed horror film and third best-reviewed film of 2014 on the site. As of 2022, Rotten Tomatoes ranks The Babadook the 13th best horror film of all time. Metacritic assigned the film a weighted average score of 86 out of 100, based on 34 critics, indicating "universal acclaim".

Glenn Kenny, writing for RogerEbert.com, called the film "the finest and most genuinely provocative horror movie to emerge in this still very-new century." Dan Schindel from Movie Mezzanine said that "The Babadook is the best genre creature creation since the big black wolf-dog aliens from Attack the Block." In The Guardian, Peter Bradshaw described the film as a "Freudian thriller", giving it 4 out of 5 stars and praised the performances, themes and Kent's direction. Bradshaw said that "Kent exerts a masterly control over this tense situation and the sound design is terrifically good: creating a haunted, insidiously whispery intimacy that never relies on sudden volume hikes for the scares." In Variety, Scott Foundas commended the production design and direction, saying that the film "manages to deliver real, seat-grabbing jolts while also touching on more serious themes of loss, grief and other demons that can not be so easily vanquished".
 
On 30 November 2014, William Friedkin, director of The Exorcist (1973) stated on his Twitter profile, "Psycho, Alien, Diabolique, and now THE BABADOOK." Friedkin also added, "I've never seen a more terrifying film. It will scare the hell out of you as it did me." Prominent British film critic Mark Kermode named The Babadook his favourite film of 2014 and in 2018 listed it his eighth favourite film of the decade. In 2022, Samuel Murrian declared it the "best horror movie so far this century" in Parade.

In subsequent years, The Babadook has been listed as a modern cult film. In The Guardian, Luke Buckmaster listed it as one of the best Australian films of the 2010s. Film scholar Amanda Howell argues that part of the film's critical success can be attributed to many film critics having discussed the film within the context of art-horror rather than purely as a horror film. Howell discussed the film as part of an international cycle of contemporary art-horror films alongside Pan's Labyrinth (2006), Let the Right One In (2008) and Antichrist (2009) that negotiate and blur the boundaries between art and horror.

Accolades

LGBT community

In October 2016, a Tumblr user joked that the Babadook is openly gay; in December 2016, another Tumblr user posted a viral screenshot showing the movie classified by Netflix as an LGBT film. Despite the absence of overt references to LGBT culture in the film, fans and journalists generated interpretations of queer subtext in the film (dubbed "Babadiscourse") that were often tongue-in-cheek, but occasionally more serious, highlighting the character's dramatic persona, grotesque costume, and chaotic effect within a traditional family structure. In June 2017, The Babadook trended on Twitter and was displayed as a symbol during that year's Pride Month. The social media response became so strong that theatres in Los Angeles took the opportunity to hold screenings of the film for charity. Michael Bronski said to the Los Angeles Times: "In this moment, who better than the Babadook to represent not only queer desire, but queer antagonism, queer in-your-faceness, queer queerness?", and drew comparisons to historic connections between queerness and horror fiction such as Frankenstein and Dracula.

Jennifer Kent said that she "loved" the meme, saying that "I think it's crazy and [the meme] just kept him alive. I thought ah, you bastard. He doesn't want to die so he's finding ways to become relevant."

Themes and symbolism
Writing for The Daily Beast, Tim Teeman contends that grief is the "real monster" in The Babadook, and that the film is "about the aftermath of death; how its remnants destroy long after the dead body has been buried or burned". Teeman writes that he was "gripped" by the "metaphorical imperative" of Kent's film, with the Babadook monster representing "the shape of grief: all-enveloping, shape-shifting, black". Teeman states that the film's ending "underscored the thrum of grief and loss at the movie's heart", and concludes that it informs the audience that grief has its place and the best that humans can do is "marshal it".

Collider also proposed that the monster "seems to symbolize Amelia and Sam’s shared grief/trauma over losing Oskar" and that Amelia's efforts to suppress this lead to it becoming stronger. The writers suggest that "healing from serious traumas in real life does not happen overnight, but takes a lot of mental and emotional processing. The Babadook warns of the dangers of trying to ignore or 'stuff' our traumas below the surface: this is the most dangerous place to put them because that’s where we lose control of them and they gain control over us."

Samuel displays some autistic traits and parents of autistic children have identified with themes in the film, including the social isolation and sleep deprivation that commonly overwhelm them.

Notes

References

External links

 
 
 
 The Babadook trailer  at Fliks.com.au
 How Jennifer Kent made The Babadook at SBS Movies

2010s English-language films
2010s monster movies
2014 directorial debut films
2014 horror films
2014 independent films
Australian supernatural horror films
Crowdfunded films
Demons in film
Features based on short films
Fictional demons and devils
Films about grieving
Films about mother–son relationships
Films about parenting
Films scored by Jed Kurzel
Films set in South Australia
Films shot in Adelaide
IFC Films films
Internet memes introduced in 2016
Kickstarter-funded films